Hapithus luteolira, the false jumping bush cricket, is a species of bush cricket in the family Gryllidae. It is found in North America.

This species was formerly a member of the genus Orocharis, which recently became a subgenus of Hapithus.

References

Hapithinae
Insects described in 1869